The House Subcommittee on Rural Development, Research, Biotechnology, and Foreign Agriculture is a subcommittee within the House Agriculture Committee. Its jurisdiction includes rural development, farm security and family farming matters, foreign agricultural assistance, and trade promotion programs. 

The subcommittee was previously known as the Subcommittee on Specialty Crops and Foreign Agriculture, but rural development was added to the subcommittee's portfolio at the start of the 110th Congress. During the 112th Congress, it acquired jurisdiction over research and biotechnology from the former Subcommittee on Conservation, Credit, Energy, and Research.

Members, 112th Congress

References

Agriculture Rural Development, Research, Biotechnology, and Foreign Agriculture